James Dillard may refer to:

 James H. Dillard (James Hardy Dillard, 1856–1940), rector of the College of William and Mary, president of the Jeanes Fund and John F. Slater Fund
 Jim Dillard (James Hardy Dillard II, born 1933), his grandson, former member of the Virginia House of Delegates
 James Price Dillard, professor of communication
 James Dillard, first officer of American Airlines Flight 191
 Jim Dillard (gridiron football) (1938–2022), American football player